Monroe Minor Redden (September 24, 1901 – December 16, 1987) was a Democratic U.S. Congressman from North Carolina between 1947 and 1953.

Redden was born in Hendersonville, North Carolina; he attended public schools and then Wake Forest College, graduating from its law school in 1923. He, and a younger brother (Arthur Redden), practiced law in Hendersonville, where he also chaired the Henderson County Democratic party from 1930 to 1946.

Redden rose to chair the North Carolina Democratic Party executive committee from 1942 to 1944. In 1946, he ran for the U.S. House and won, serving for a total of three terms (January 3, 1947 – January 3, 1953).

Redden retired from Congress in 1952 and returned to his law practice. He was president of the Southern Heritage Life Insurance Company, from 1956 to 1959. Redden died in his hometown of Hendersonville in 1987.

External links

1901 births
1987 deaths
People from Hendersonville, North Carolina
Democratic Party members of the United States House of Representatives from North Carolina
Wake Forest University alumni
20th-century American politicians